Durgapur is a planned tier-II urban agglomeration and a major industrial city in Paschim Bardhaman district in the Indian state of West Bengal. It is the fourth largest urban agglomeration after Kolkata, Asansol and Siliguri in West Bengal and a major industrial hub of West Bengal. It was planned by two American architects, Joseph Allen Stein and Benjamin Polk in 1955. Durgapur is the only city in eastern India to have an operational dry dock. Durgapur has been nicknamed the 'Ruhr of India'.

Geography

Location

Durgapur is in the Paschim Bardhaman district of West Bengal, on the bank of the Damodar River, just before it enters the alluvial plains of Bengal. The topography is undulating. The coal-bearing area of the Raniganj coalfields lies just beyond Durgapur; some parts intrude into the area. The area was deeply forested until recent times, and some streaks of the original sal and eucalyptus forests can still be seen.

Civic administration

Police stations
Durgapur police station, located on Aurobindo Avenue, Durgapur Steel Township, has jurisdiction over parts of Andal CD Block. The area covered is 80 km2 and the population covered is 292,841.

Coke Oven police station, located near Durgapur railway station, has jurisdiction over parts of Durgapur municipal corporation. The area covered is 49 km2 and the population covered is 136,181.

New Township police station, located in MAMC township, has jurisdiction over parts of Durgapur municipal corporation and Faridpur Durgapur CD Block. The area covered is 23 km2 and the population covered is 160,411.

Demographics
In the 2011 census, Durgapur Urban Agglomeration had a population of 581,409 out of which 301,700 were males and 279,709 were females. The 0–6 years population was 51,930. Effective literacy rate for the 7+ population was 87.70. Durgapur Urban Agglomeration included Durgapur (M. Corp) and 2 census towns: Bamunara and Arra.

In the 2011 census, Durgapur Municipal Corporation had a population of 566,937 out of which 294,349 were males and 272,588 were females. The 0–6 years population was 50,512. Effective literacy rate for the 7+ population was 87.84.

Religion 
According to Census of India 2011, Hinduism is the predominant religion in this city, followed by Islam, Christianity, Sikhism, Buddhism, Jainism and others. Out of 5,66,517 people living in Durgapur (Municipal Corporation); 5,19,122 are Hindus (91.63%), 35,923 are Muslims (6.34%), 1889 are Christians (0.36%), 2346 are Sikhs (0.44%), 513 are Buddhists, 382 are Jains, 906 are other religions and 5436 (1.04%) did not state their religion.

Economy

Durgapur is the biggest industrial hub of West Bengal (also one of the biggest industrial hubs in India) and was planned as an integrated industrial city. It lies on the banks of Damodar river and coalfields of Raniganj. Durgapur was a dream of former prime minister of India, Jawaharlal Nehru and chief minister of West Bengal, Bidhan Chandra Roy. The first project in Durgapur was Damodar Valley Corporation's Durgapur Barrage which attracted many public sector units. Durgapur Steel Plant was the first PSU established in the region in 1955 with the help of U.K which was later undertaken by SAIL. Later, an alloy plant was established by Hindustan Steel.Ltd in 1965 which was also acquired by SAIL. Mining and Allied Machinery Corp (MAMC) established in 1964 (now closed but reviving with J.V of Bharat Earth Movers, Coal India & DVC). Hindustan Fertilisers Corporation (HFC) was also operational but got closed down (now RCF showed interest to reopen it).

Durgapur is also an emerging IT and real estate hub. The Government of West Bengal's Webel IT Park houses some of well-known as well as startup software companies generating employment opportunities for the youth of the region. It is set to develop many proposed residential areas like DLF's Durgapur Township.

Transport

Road
Durgapur is the preferred gateway to the districts of Bankura, Birbhum (Bolpur, Rampurhat, Suri), and Purulia. NH 19 (old numbering: NH 2) passes through the city jurisdiction and SH 9 originates from Muchipara in the city. NH 14 (old numbering NH 60) passes through the north-western suburb of Pandabeswar and finally passes through Raniganj and heads away towards Odisha. It happens to be one of the very few cities that have an Asian Highway (AH) passing directly through the city jurisdiction. The AH1 links Japan with Turkey, through Korea, China, Vietnam, Cambodia, Thailand, Myanmar, India, Bangladesh, Pakistan, Afghanistan, and Iran.

Durgapur has bus terminuses at Prantika, City Center, and at Railway Station. Within the city, private mini-buses operate from Station terminus to Prantika, via different routes through the city.

Auto-rickshaws ply between City Center, Benachity, William Kery, Chandidas, Mamra, Bidhannagar, Railway Station and other parts of the city in a number of routes. Pre-paid taxis are available in the city from Station Terminus. Additionally, cab and auto-rickshaw services for the city are offered online.

Only one bus is available for the Kalyani-Bansberia route and it departs from Benachity at 4:40 am and from Kalyani at 10 am every day.

Various private buses ranging from sleepers to premium Volvos are available from City Center, Durgapur for Kolkata, Asansol, Barddhaman, Barakar, Bhubaneswar, Digha and other nearby cities. Durgapur is the headquarters of SBSTC which provides government bus services to Kolkata, Haldia, Digha, Bankura etc. from Durgapur and Asansol. Private buses are available for Asansol, Barakar, Bardhaman, Bolpur, Bishnupur, Chittaranjan, Deoghar, Digha, Illambajar, Jhargram, Kalna, Katwa, Kharagpur, Krishnanagar, Medinipur, Nabadwip, Nalhati, Purulia, Rampurhat, Siuri, Tatanagar, Tarakeswar, etc.

Air
The city is home to a domestic airport, the Kazi Nazrul Islam Airport. It is India's first private-sector Greenfield airport. It is located at a place called Andal which is roughly 15 kilometres from Durgapur's City Center Bus Terminus. The airport has direct flights to New Delhi, Mumbai, Chennai, Bangalore and Hyderabad, which are operated by IndiGo and Spicejet. And an old DSP Airport at Bijra near IQ city.

An air force station at Panagarh (16.3 km from Durgapur City Centre), belonging to the Indian Air Force, is used as a base for a C-130J Hercules squadronal.

Rail
Durgapur is served by Durgapur railway station. It is one of the most important station of Eastern Railways where almost all express trains give a stop, except a few long-distance trains like the Howrah - New Delhi Rajdhani express and Duronto express. It falls in the Bardhaman-Asansol section of Eastern Railways and Howrah-Gaya-Delhi line of Indian Railways.

Climate

Durgapur experiences a somewhat transitional climate between the tropical wet and dry climate of Kolkata and the more humid subtropical climate further north. Summers are extremely hot and dry, lasting from March to the middle of June, with average daily temperatures near 40 °C. They are followed by the monsoon season with heavy precipitation and somewhat lower temperatures. Durgapur receives most of its annual rainfall of around 1,320 mm during this season. The monsoon is followed by a mild, dry winter from November to January. Temperatures are quite moderate, with average daily temperatures near 16 °C. There is a short autumn at the end of October and a short spring in February, both of which have relatively moderate temperatures of around 20 °C. Due to the heavy rainfall it has received in recent years, for almost five months of heavy rainfall every year, locals often refer to the city as “Chhota Cherapunji”. ( named after the main city of Cherapunji )

Administrative changes 
The administrative setup came in stages. In 1837, when Bankura district was formed, Durgapur area was part of it. In 1847, Raniganj subdivision was formed with three police stations – Raniganj, Kanksa, and Neamatpur - and it was made a part of Bardhaman district. In 1906, the subdivisional headquarters was shifted to Burdwan and the subdivision renamed accordingly. In 1910, the police stations in Asansol subdivision were Asansol, Ranigunj, Kanksa, Faridpur, and Barakar. On 14 April 1968, Durgapur subdivision was carved out of Asansol subdivision.
In 2011, the Asansol Durgapur Police Commissionerate (ADPC) was formed by the State Government.

Education

Colleges 

Durgapur is home to National Institute of Technology, Durgapur, an autonomous institution in eastern India of national importance. It is one of the 31 N.I.T.s in the country. N.I.T. Durgapur is one of the 8 old Regional Engineering Colleges established in 1956.

Durgapur Government College is the only government college not only in the home district of Burdwan but also in the neighbouring districts of Bankura, Purulia and Birbhum. It was established on 15 September 1970 and was affiliated to the University of Burdwan which later got affiliated to Kazi Nazrul University.

The Central Mechanical Engineering Research Institute (also known as CSIR-CMERI Durgapur or CMERI Durgapur) is a public engineering research and development institution in Durgapur, West Bengal, India. It is a constituent laboratory of the Indian Council of Scientific and Industrial Research (CSIR). The institute is dedicated to work in the mechanical and allied engineering disciplines.

The National Power Training Institute (Also known as NPTI(ER) and formerly known as PETS, Durgapur) is an institute under Ministry of Power, Government of India which offers postgraduate education in the field of power plants. This institute is also associated with several industrial bodies for imparting training to plant personnel.

Durgapur Institute of Advanced Technology and Management, Dr. B.C. Roy Engineering College and the Bengal College of Engineering and Technology offer engineering degrees. They are affiliated to Maulana Abul Kalam Azad University of Technology (MAKAUT), formerly known as West Bengal University of Technology (WBUT). Durgapur Women's College and Michael Madhusudan Memorial College are general degree colleges affiliated to Kazi Nazrul University.

Schools 

Durgapur houses a large number of government aided and public schools in addition to two Kendriya Vidyalaya and Jawahar Navodaya Vidyalaya (under the Government of India). Notable private schools include: St. Michael's School, St. Xavier's School,Carmel Convent High School, Pranavananda Vidyamandir and Amrai High School.

Sports facilities
Nehru Stadium  is the biggest sports stadium in the city. It has a huge football ground, basketball and volleyball courts, athletic tracks, modern fully equipped gymnasium etc. It is managed by Durgapur Steel Plant Authority.
ASP Stadium is another sporting centre with a large ground, with all facilities for cricket, football, gymnastics, etc. It is managed by the Alloy Steel Plant Authority.
Shahid Bhagat Singh Kridangan is a newly developed stadium, which is run by the Durgapur Municipal Corporation. Its football ground is one of the best in West Bengal. Teams like Mohun Bagan A.C. conduct their pre-season training camps here.
Sidhu Kanu Indoor Stadium houses many sporting organisation and sporting association of Burdwan district, including Durgapur Sub-divisional Women's Sports Association, School Sports Association-Durgapur Sub-division, Burdwan District Badminton Association, Burdwan District Table Tennis Association and Burdwan District Physical Culture Association.

Media
Durgapur has several electronic media houses. Express News, DSTV (owned by DSP), Hallow India, TV Bangla are some of them., are printed from the city. Anandabazar Patrika is published from Ghutgoria, near Durgapur, in Bankura District, and has a separate Asansol-Durgapur edition. Samay Sanket is another newspaper published from Durgapur. Dainik Jagaran has a Durgapur Edition, too. Durgapur does not have any F.M. stations. However All India Radio 100.3 FM, 92.7 Big FM, 93.5 Red FM and Radio Mirchi 95 FM has stations at Asansol and serve both Asansol and Durgapur.

Notable people 
 Abhisek Banerjee, Former Indian domestic cricketer.
 Aishe Ghosh, Indian research scholar and student leader of SFI.
 Aloke Paul, recipient of the Shanti Swarup Bhatnagar Prize for Science and Technology, Alumni of National Institute of Technology, Durgapur, Born in Durgapur.
 Ananda Gopal Mukhopadhyay, Former Politician and Leader, Indian National Congress.
 Bikash Sinha, chairman of the Board of Governors of the National Institute of Technology, Durgapur.
 Bikramjit Basu, recipient of the Shanti Swarup Bhatnagar Prize for Science and Technology, Alumni of National Institute of Technology, Durgapur.
 Bimal Mitra, Indian Bengali Author and author of Saheb Bibi Golam.
 Dipali Saha, Politician, All India Trinamool Congress, won from Sonamukhi (Vidhan Sabha constituency), formerly within Durgapur (Lok Sabha constituency)).
 Kalipada Bauri, Former Politician who won from Gangajalghati, formerly within Durgapur (Lok Sabha constituency)) from Communist Party of India (Marxist).
 Kamanio Chattopadhyay, recipient of the Shanti Swarup Bhatnagar Prize for Science and Technology, Alumni of National Institute of Technology, Durgapur.
 Lalbihari Bhattacharya, Former Politician who won from Barjora (Vidhan Sabha constituency), formerly within Durgapur (Lok Sabha constituency)) from Communist Party of India (Marxist).
 Mamtaz Sanghamita, Former Member of Parliament, Bardhaman–Durgapur (Lok Sabha constituency) belonging to All India Trinamool Congress
 Mika Singh, Indian Playback Singer and live performer.
 Mrinal Banerjee, Former Minister of Power, State of West Bengal and former leader of Communist Party of India (Marxist).
 Munmun Dutta, Indian Film Actress. 
 Nikhil Kumar Banerjee, Indian physician and Politician belonging to All India Trinamool Congress.
 Prayas Ray Barman, Indian Cricketer, Youngest debutant in Indian Premier League.
 Saidul Haque, Former Member of Parliament, Bardhaman–Durgapur (Lok Sabha constituency) belonging to Communist Party of India (Marxist)
 Sandip Burman, Tabla Player and Musician. 
 Sri Zaheer, 12th and current dean of the Carlson School of Management, University of Minnesota.
 Subir Chowdhury, CEO and MD of JCB India.
 Sudip Chattopadhyay, Indian developmental biologist, biotechnologist and the dean of research and consultancy at the National Institute of Technology, Durgapur.
 Sunil Kumar Mandal, Indian Politician and Member of Parliament, Purba Bardhaman, who previously won from Galsi, within Bardhaman–Durgapur (Lok Sabha constituency), from Forward Bloc.
 S. S. Ahluwalia, Member of Parliament, Bardhaman–Durgapur (Lok Sabha constituency) belonging to Bhartiya Janata Party.
 Swami Ashokananda, Disciple of Swami Vivekananda.
 Tushar Dutta, Classical Music Vocalist.

References

External links 

 Bardhaman district official site
 

 
Cities and towns in Paschim Bardhaman district
Cities in West Bengal
Planned cities in India